Yumiko is a feminine Japanese given name.

Possible writings
Yumiko can be written using different kanji characters and can mean:
弓子, "bow, child".
由美子, "reason/cause, beauty, child".
結実子, "fruition, child".
夕実子, "evening, fruit, child".
優美子, "tenderness, beauty, child".
悠美子, "permanence, beauty, child".
祐美子, "help, beauty, child".
由実子, "reason/cause, fruit, child".
有美子, "exist/possess, beauty, child".
夕美子, "evening, beauty, child".
友美子, "friend, beauty, child".
裕美子, "rich, beauty, child".
勇美子, "brave, beauty, child".

The name can also be written in hiragana or katakana.

People
Yumiko Abe (由美子), a Japanese professional wrestler.
Yumiko Cheng (鄭烈瓊), a Hong Kong Cantopop singer.
Yumiko Fujita (弓子), a Japanese actress.
Yumiko Fukushima, announcer.
Yumiko Hara (裕美子), a Japanese marathon runner.
Yumiko Hosono (佑美子), a Japanese voice actress, actress, and singer.
Yumiko Hotta (祐美子), a Japanese professional wrestler and mixed martial artist.
Yumiko Igarashi (ゆみこ), a Japanese manga artist.
Yumiko Kobayashi (由美子, born 1979), a Japanese voice actress.
Yumiko Kokonoe (佑三子), a Japanese actress.
Yumiko Ōshima (弓子), a Japanese manga artist.
Yumiko Nakagawa, a Japanese girl at the center of an Okinawan controversy.
Yumiko Shaku (由美子), a Japanese actress and model.
Yumiko Shibata (由美子), a Japanese voice actress.
Yumiko Suzuki (disambiguation), multiple people.
Yumiko Takeshima (竹島 由美子), a Japanese costume designer, ballet dancer, and founder of YUMIKO dancewear.

Fictional characters
Yumiko Kusaka (友美子), a character in the novel, film and manga Battle Royale.
Yumiko Shirasagi (白鷺弓子), a character in the novel series Digital Devil Story and the video game adaptation Digital Devil Story: Megami Tensei.
Yumiko Takagi (高木由美子), a character in the anime and manga series Hellsing.
Yumiko Sakaki (榊由美子), a character in the Grisaia series of visual novels.
Yumiko (弓子), a female Japanese-American character in the comic book series The Walking Dead as well as the TV series adaptation.
Yumiko "Hibana" Imagawa (今川 由美子), a character in the video game series Tom Clancy's Rainbow Six Siege, nicknamed Hibana (Rainbow_Six_Siege).
Yumiko, a character in the fighting game, Brawlhalla.
Mirkou Yumiko, a character from  Kusunoki Mebuki is a Hero.

References

Japanese feminine given names